Amor de madre (lit. "Mother's Love") is a Peruvian telenovela produced by Michelle Alexander and broadcast by América Televisión from 10 August to 20 November 2015.

Cast 
 Pierina Carcelén as Clara Porras Quispe
 Vanessa Saba as María Eduarda  Vda de Bérmudez
 Jimena Lindo as Alicia Tapia Mendoza de Córdova
 Alexandra Graña as Ofelia Tapia Mendoza
 Tula Rodríguez as Yoliruth Cárdenas
 Stefano Salvini as Hugo Osorio Porras / Ángel Hidalgo
 David Villanueva as Iván Hidalgo Lozano
 Gonzalo Molina as Raúl Córdova Suárez
 Rodrigo Sánchez Patiño sa Otoniel Camacho Tirado
 André Silva as Giovanni Choque Salvatierra
 Maria Grazia Gamarra as Camila Bérmudez
 Andrea Luna as Lucía Bérmudez
 Emanuel Soriano as Tadeo Córdova Tapia
 Vania Accinelli as Sara Osorio Porras "Sarita"
 Silvana Cañote as Lizbeth Córdova Tapia
 Mariano García-Rosell as Cipriano Osorio Porras
 Pold Gastello as Igor Trelles Talledo
 Irene Eyzaguirre as Dumancia
 Amparo Brambilla as Madame Collete
 Anaí Padilla as Mafalda "Mishka"
 Alana La Madrid as Paloma
 Alberick García as Roberto Osorio Chauca "Tito"
 Renato Bonifaz as  Pablo "El Griego"
 Andrea Fernández as Commander Cecilia Peralta Ruíz
 Fiorella Díaz as Esther Benavides de Souza
 Enrique Victoria as Alcídes "Gavilán"
 Mariella Zanetti as Josefina Barraza Terrones
 Diego Lombardi as Gonzalo Souza
 Emilia Drago as Carolina
 Gustavo Mac Lennan as Dr. Remigio Beraún
 Zoe Arévalo as Stephanie Souza Benavides
 Dante del Águila as Kelvin
 Ingrid Altamirano as Silvana
 Daniella Pflucker as Alexa
 Bruno Espejo as Mauro
 Luis José Ocampo as Fernandinho
 Lucía Carlín as Madeleine
 Fernando Fermor as Roberto
 Sandra Bernasconi as Olinda
 Miguel Ángel Álvarez as Alberto
 Homero Cristalli as Ramiro
 Thiago Basurto as Hugo Osorio Porras (child)
 Francisca Aronsson as Camila Bermúdez (child)
 Salvador del Solar as Esteban Bérmudez

References

External links 
  
 

2015 telenovelas
2015 Peruvian television series debuts
2015 Peruvian television series endings
Peruvian telenovelas
Spanish-language telenovelas
América Televisión telenovelas